Saber Nakdali (born 1 March 1960) is a Syrian former wrestler who competed in the 1980 Summer Olympics.

References

External links
 

1960 births
Living people
Olympic wrestlers of Syria
Wrestlers at the 1980 Summer Olympics
Syrian male sport wrestlers
20th-century Syrian people